Lindsay David "Les" Husband (12 July 1898 – 11 March 1970) was a former Australian rules footballer who played with Carlton in the Victorian Football League (VFL).

Early life
Les Husband was born in Richmond, Victoria on 12 July 1898.

Career

VFL

Carlton Blues career: 1923-1924

Under captain coach, Horrie Clover, Les would join the Carlton Blues for his first senior match at 24 years old as a ruck. The game would take place on 7 July 1923 against the Geelong Cats in round 9 of the season.

Ice Hockey 

Les Husband played ice hockey for the Brighton Ice Hockey Club in the 1924 season of the Victorian Ice Hockey Association, he played Right Wing.

See also

Notes

External links 

Les Husband's profile at Blueseum

1898 births
1970 deaths
Carlton Football Club players
Australian rules footballers from Melbourne
People from Richmond, Victoria
Australian ice hockey right wingers